Deh Pain Rural District is a rural district (dehestan) in the Central District of Ilam County, Ilam Province, Iran. At the 2006 census, its population was 7,888, in 1,529 families.  The rural district has 5 villages.

References 

Rural Districts of Ilam Province
Ilam County